Faduma Sarjelle was a princess of the House of Gareen, the ruling dynasty of the Ajuran Sultanate. The Sultanate ruled over large parts of the Horn of Africa during the Middle Ages. Sarjelle was also the mother of Abgal Ismaan, the clan forefather of the Abgaal clan.

See also
Ajuran Sultanate

References

Ajuran Sultanate
Somali princesses